Nasageneia is a genus of amphipods belonging to the family Pontogeneiidae.

The species of this genus are found in Northern and Central America.

Species:
 Nasageneia bacescui Ortiz & Lalana, 1994 
 Nasageneia comisariensis Ortiz & Lemaitre, 1997

References

Amphipoda
Crustacean genera